FK Poeševo is a football club based in the village of Poeševo near Bitola, North Macedonia. They currently play in the OFS Bitola First Division league.

History
The club was founded in 1978.

References

External links
FK Poeševo Facebook 
Club info at MacedonianFootball 
Football Federation of Macedonia 

Poesevo
Association football clubs established in 1978
1978 establishments in the Socialist Republic of Macedonia
FK